Batla House is a 2019 Indian Hindi-language action thriller film written by Ritesh Shah, and directed by Nikkhil Advani. Inspired by the Batla House encounter case 2008, the film stars John Abraham as police officer Sanjay Kumar, the police officer who played an important role in the encounter, leading to the demise of his colleague Mohan Chand Sharma. The film showcases the encounter, and in its aftermath, Sanjay's struggle to catch the fugitives and prove the authenticity of the encounter, while dealing with nationwide hatred and post-traumatic stress disorder.

The film was theatrically released in India on 15 August 2019, coinciding with Independence Day.

Plot 
Assistant Commissioner of Police Sanjay Kumar is informed that his team has cornered 5 university students in L-18, Batla House, who might have been involved in the 13 September 2008 Delhi bombings, the responsibility for which was claimed by the terrorist organization "Indian Mujahideen" (IM). Sanjeev orders not to engage until he arrives, but a relentless inspector, Krishan Kumar Verma alias K.K., proceeds with some officers. Sanjay arrives and, upon hearing the gunshots, decides to engage. The building is cleared, and K.K. is found shot down. Sanjay enters the room, and there's more shooting, as a result of which two students, Adil Ameen & Sadiq Khan, end up dead, and Tufail Khan is arrested alive. Dilshad Ahmed and Javed Ali escape and Sanjay now starts facing the heat from media and politicians, who start billing the encounter as a fake one. They're joined by the whole nation in condemning the Delhi Police, and everyone starts demanding justice for the students who were supposedly killed to account for the bombings. Sanjay's wife, Nandita Kumar, a news anchor, is however unwilling to accept this and decides to stay with Sanjay, who soon becomes diagnosed with post-traumatic stress disorder, frequently hallucinating about getting shot by the terrorists. Nandita somehow stops him whenever he becomes suicidal.

Sanjay now starts looking for the missing Dilshad and Javed and finds one of them to be hiding in Nizampur, Uttar Pradesh. He is informed by the police commissioner that he would be awarded for the encounter and that he must celebrate. Realizing he's not been told where to celebrate, he heads to Nizampur, where he manages to find Dilshad. Everyone tries to stop Sanjay, who chases, beats up, and almost arrests Dilshad, only for him to be cornered by the politicians and the public who let him escape but without Dilshad.

After being awarded the President Medal, Sanjay begins his hunt again and this time, through Dilshad's girlfriend Victoria alias "Huma", tricks him into coming to Nepal. He teams up with his officers once again and sends a van to pick up Dilshad, as a part of his plan. The latter, however, sends someone else to check for anything suspicious. Sanjay runs to stop his officers from engaging upon realizing Dilshad's not in the van and lets it flee. Learning of nothing suspicious, Dilshad informs the van driver he'd depart the next day, and upon landing in Nepal, is stopped, thrashed, and arrested by Sanjay and his team.

The court proceedings begin, where the opposing lawyer, Shailesh Arya, brings up arguments to counter Sanjay's truth and a parallel story of fake encounters, as per which K.K. and his men brought the students in L-18 tortured, and decided to kill them when they were ordered not to do so, following which K.K. was shot by one of his officers. Sanjay, however, brings out the truth that actually, his officers had been closely watching the students and realized they belonged to the IM. The real shootout then plays out, showcasing K.K. and his team engaging during the students' fire, and the very fact that K.K. died while giving Sanjay's argument strong support when he tells everyone that no officer has ever died in a fake encounter. His arguments convince the court to sentence the 2 terrorists to life imprisonment, while the last one somehow escapes the country.

While sections of the media still oppose the ruling and believe the police to be culprits, a video clip that surfaced in 2016 featured a confession from the terrorist Javed who had escaped the encounter, about how he managed to do so and later join the ISIS, further confirming the credibility of the encounter.

Cast 
 John Abraham as ACP Sanjay Kumar (based on DCP Sanjeev Kumar Yadav)
 Mrunal Thakur as Nandita Kumar (based on Shobhna Yadav)
 Ravi Kishan as Inspector Krishan Kumar "K.K." Verma (based on Inspector Mohan Chand Sharma)
 Manish Chaudhari as Police Commissioner Jaiveer Singh
 Rajesh Sharma as Defense Lawyer Shailesh Arya
 Pramod Pathak as Lawyer P. Krishnan
 Nora Fatehi as Victoria/Huma
 Sahidur Rahman as Dilshad Ahmed
 Kranti Prakash Jha as Adil Ameen
 Alok Pandey as Tufail Khan
 Faizan Khan as Javed Ali
 Niranjan Jadhao as Sadiq Khan
 Chirag Katrecha as Zia
 Yatharth Kansal as Arif Zar
 Utkarsh Rai as Judge Ramesh Arora
 Sandeep Yadav as Minister
 Sonam Arora as Sunita Verma

Production
In May 2018, Nikkhil Advani announced the film with John Abraham, to be based on Operation Batla House of 2008. The film was to be shot in Delhi, Lucknow, Mussoorie, Mumbai, Jaipur and Nepal starting in September 2018 in a span of 50 days. Ravi Kishan and Nora Fatehi joined the cast of Batla House in November 2018. The film was wrapped up in the second week of February in 2019.

Release
The film was released on 15 August 2019, coinciding with Independence Day and clashing with Akshay Kumar's Mission Mangal.

Soundtrack 

The songs are composed by Rochak Kohli, Tanishk Bagchi, Taz and Ankit Tiwari. Lyrics are written by Tanishk Bagchi, Gautam Sharma, Gurpreet Saini, and Prince Dubey. The first song, "O Saki Saki," is a version of the song "of the same name" from the 2004 film Musafir. The song "O Saki Saki" was launched on 15 July 2019. "O Saki Saki" has become a TikTok trend as of June 2020 with users doing the dance, and had also become the namesake for a character in the Japanese manga and anime series Girlfriend, Girlfriend.

One of the songs, "Gallan Goriyan", was removed from the film's final cut and was instead released as a separate single due to thematic inconsistency at the time of the film's release. The song, a recreated version of an eponymous original from the 2000 album Oh Laila, was released on 11 June 2020 by T-Series. The song tells the prequel of this movie.

Reception

Critical response 
The film received mixed reviews from critics. Bollywood Hungama gave the film 4.5 stars out of 5 and called it "one of the finest films of the year" while praising the performances of John Abraham and Ravi Kishan, the action sequences and the screenplay. The Times of India gave it 3.5 stars out of 5 and felt that Abraham delivered "the best of his career" performance, while also praising the action sequences but criticizing the pacing of the second half. Prasanna D Zore writing for Rediff.com gave it 2 stars out of 5 and noted that only second half had gripping moments.

Box office 
Batla House earned a decent 14 crore nett in India on its opening day. It dropped 50 percent to earn 7.5 crore nett on the second day. On Saturday, the third day, the film's business grew by 30 percent to 10 crore nett, for a three-day total of 31.5 crore nett.

, with a gross of 102.61 crore in India and 10.77 crore overseas, the film has grossed 113.38  crore worldwide.

Home video
Batla House was made available as VOD on Amazon Prime Video in October 2019.

References

External links
 
 

T-Series (company) films
2019 films
2010s Hindi-language films
2019 action drama films
2019 action thriller films
Indian action drama films
Indian action thriller films
Indian police films
Indian films based on actual events
Action films based on actual events
Drama films based on actual events
Thriller films based on actual events
Films set in Delhi
Films about post-traumatic stress disorder
Films with screenplays by Ritesh Shah
Films directed by Nikkhil Advani
Films set in 2008
Films about police officers
2010s police films
Fictional portrayals of the Delhi Police
Films set in Nepal
Films shot in Delhi
Films shot in Uttar Pradesh
Films shot in Uttarakhand
Films shot in Mumbai
Films shot in Jaipur
Films shot in Nepal